Early New High German (ENHG) is a term for the period  in the history of the German language generally defined, following Wilhelm Scherer, as the period 1350 to 1650.

The term is the standard translation of the German  (Fnhd., Frnhd.), introduced by Scherer. The term Early Modern High German is also occasionally used for this period (but the abbreviation EMHG is generally used for Early Middle High German).

Periodisation

The start and end dates of ENHG are, like all linguistic periodisations, somewhat arbitrary. In spite of many alternative suggestions, Scherer's dates still command widespread acceptance. Linguistically, the mid-14th century is marked by the phonological changes to the vowel system that characterise the modern standard language; the mid-17th sees the loss of status for regional forms of language, and the triumph of German over Latin as the dominant, and then sole, language for public discourse.

Scherer's dates also have the merit of coinciding with two major demographic catastrophes with linguistic consequences: the Black Death, and the end of the Thirty Years' War. Arguably, the Peace of Westphalia in 1648, by ending religious wars and creating a Germany of many small sovereign states, brought about the essential political conditions for the final development of a universally acceptable standard language in the subsequent New High German period.

Alternative periodisations take the period to begin later, such as the invention of printing with moveable type in the 1450s.

Geographical variation
There was no standard Early New High German, and all forms of language display some local or regional characteristics. However, there was increasing harmonisation in the written and printed word, the start of developments towards the unified standard which was codified in the New High German period.

Dialects
With the end of eastward expansion, the geographical spread and the dialect map of German in the ENHG period remained the same as at the close of the MHG period.

, "printers' languages"

Since the printers had a commercial interest in making their texts acceptable to a wide readership, they often strove to avoid purely local forms of language. This gave rise to so-called  ("printers' languages"), which are not necessarily identical to the spoken dialect of the town where the press was located. The most important centres of printing, with their regional  are:
West Central German: Frankfurt, Mainz, Worms, Cologne
East Central German: Wittenberg, Erfurt, Leipzig
Swabian: Augsburg, Ulm, Tübingen
Alemannic: Basel, Strassburg, Zürich
East Franconian: Nuremberg, Bamberg, Würzburg
Austro-Bavarian: Ingolstadt, Vienna.

Chancery languages
 The  ("common German") of the Chancery of the Emperor Maximilian I and his successors in Prague and then Vienna.
 The East Central German of the Chancery of the Electorate of Saxony in Meissen
The language of these centres had influence well beyond their own territorial and dialect boundaries.

The influence of the Saxon Chancery was due in part to its adoption for his own published works by Martin Luther, who stated, "" ("My language is based on that of the Saxon Chancery, which is followed by all the princes and kings in Germany").

He also recognized the standardising force of the two chanceries: "" ("The Emperor Maximilian and Duke Frederick, Elector of Saxony etc., have drawn the languages of Germany together").

Low German
Middle Low German, spoken across the whole of Northern Germany north of the Benrath Line in the Middle Ages, was a distinct West Germanic language. From the start of the 16th century, however, High German came increasingly to be used in this area not only in writing but also in the pulpit and in schools. By the end of the ENHG period, Low German had almost completely ceased to be used in writing or in formal and public speech and had become the low-status variant in a diglossic situation, with High German as the high-status variant.

Phonology and orthography
For a number of reasons it is not possible to give a single phonological system for ENHG:
 dialectal variation
 the differing times at which individual dialects introduced even shared sound changes
 the lack of a prestige variant (such as the "Dichtersprache" provides for Middle High German)
Also, the difficulty of deriving phonological information from the complexity of ENHG orthography means that many reference works do not treat orthography and phonology separately for this period.

Vowels
The MHG vowel system undergoes significant changes in the transition to ENHG and their uneven geographical distribution has served to further differentiate the modern dialects.

Diphthongization

Examples:
MHG snîden ("to cut") > NHG schneiden
MHG hût ("skin") > NHG Haut
MHG liute ("people") > NHG Leute.

This change started as early as the 12th century in Upper Bavarian, and only reached Moselle Franconian in the 16th century. It does not affect Alemannic or Ripuarian dialects, which still retain the original long vowels. The map shows the distribution and chronology of this sound change. In Bavarian, the original diphthongs are monophthongized, avoiding a merger with the new diphthongs.

Monophthongisation
In the case of  >  the MHG spelling is retained and in Modern German  indicates the long vowel.

Examples:
MHG liebe ("love) > NHG Liebe  
MHG bruoder ("brother") > NHG Bruder  
MHG brüeder ("brothers") > NHG Brüder 

This change, sometimes called the Central German Monophthongisation, affects mainly the Central German dialects, along with South Franconian and East Franconian. The other Upper German dialects largely retain the original diphthongs.

Changes in vowel quantity
There are two changes in vowel quantity in ENHG, the lengthening of short vowels and the shortening of long vowels. Both show wide variation between dialects but appear earlier and more completely in Central German dialects. Many individual words form exceptions to these changes, though the lengthening is carried out more consistently.

1. Lengthening:  MHG short vowels in open syllables (that is, syllables that end in a vowel) tend to be lengthened in the ENHG period. This is not reflected directly in spelling, but it is the source of the Modern German spelling convention that a vowel ending a syllable is always long.

Examples:
MHG sagen  ("to say") > NHG sagen  
MHG übel  ("evil") > NHG Übel 

2.

Examples:
MHG hât ("has") > NHG hat
MHG dâhte ("thought") > NHG dachte
MHG lêrche ("lark") > NHG Lerche
MHG jâmer ("suffering") > NHG Jammer
This shortening seems to have taken place later than the monophthongisation, since the long vowels which result from that change are often shortened.

Examples:
MHG muoter ("mother" > NHG Mutter (via )
MHG lieht ("light" > NHG Licht (via )

Consonants
The overall consonant system of German remains largely unchanged in the transition from MHG to  Modern German. However, in many cases sounds changed in particular environments and therefore changed in distribution. Some of the more significant are the following. (In addition, there are many other changes in particular dialects or in particular words.)

MHG had two sibilants, written / and /.
MHG sehen  ("to see")  > NHG sehen .
Initially before consonants  becomes , indicated by the grapheme <sch>, e.g. MHG snîden ("to cut") > NHG schneiden . Before  and  this is not indicated in spelling, e.g. MHG stein ("stone") > NHG Stein .

In initial position the bilabial fricative  becomes the labio-dental , though this is not reflected in any change in spelling, e.g. MHG wil ("want to") > NHG will . In a few words, this also takes place between vowels, e.g. ewig  ("eternal").
Otherwise it is either lost, e.g. MHG snėwes ("of the snow") > NHG Schnees, or forms a diphthong with a neighbouring vowel (e.g. MHG brâwe ("brow") > NHG Braue.

Medial  is lost, though it remains in spelling to indicate the length of the preceding vowel, e.g. MHG sehen  ("to see") > NHG sehen .

Morphology
As with phonology, the range of variation between dialects and time periods makes it impossible to cite a unified morphology for ENHG.
The sound changes of the vowels had which brought consequent changes to
 verb conjugations
 further simplification of the noun declensions

Syntax
The following are the main syntactical developments in ENHG:
Noun phrase
Increasing complexity: in chancery documents noun phrases increasingly incorporate prepositional and participial phases, and this development spreads from there to other types of formal and official writing.
Attributive genitive: the so-called "Saxon genitive", in which the genitive phrase precedes the noun (e.g. der sunnen schein, literally "of-the-sun shine") increasingly makes way for the now standard, post-nominal construction (e.g. der schein der sonne, literally "the shine of the sun"), though it remains the norm where the noun in the genitive is a proper noun (Marias Auto).
Verb phrase
Increasing complexity: more complex verbal constructions with participles and infinitives.
Verb position: the positioning of verbal components characteristic of NHG (finite verb second in main clauses, first in subordinate clauses; non-finite verb forms in clause-final position) gradually becomes firmly established.
Decline of the preterite: an earlier development in the spoken language (especially in Upper German), the replacement of simple preterite forms by perfect forms with an auxiliary verb and the past participle becomes increasingly common from the 17th century.
Negation: double negation ceases to be acceptable as an intensified negation; the enclitic negative particle ne/en falls out of use and an adverb of negation (nicht, nie) becomes obligatory (e.g.MHG ine weiz (niht), ENHG ich weiss nicht, "I don't know").
Case government
Decline of the genitive: Verbs that take a genitive object increasingly replace this with an accusative object or a prepositional phrase. Prepositions that govern the genitive likewise tend to switch to the accusative.

Literature

The period saw the invention of printing with moveable type (c.1455) and the Reformation (from 1517). Both of these were significant contributors to the development of the Modern German Standard language, as they further promoted the development of non-local forms of language and exposed all speakers to forms of German from outside their own area  – even the illiterate, who were read to. The most important single text of the period was Luther's Bible translation, the first part of which was published in 1522, though this is now not credited with the central role in creating the standard that was once attributed to it. This is also the first period in which prose works, both literary and discursive, became more numerous and more important than verse.

Example texts

The Gospel of John, 1:1–5

From Fortunatus

See also
 Early Modern English
 German language
 German literature of the Baroque period
 Middle High German
 New High German

Notes

References

Primary Sources

Further reading

Grammar
  7 vols.
  (Reprint of 1909 edition)

Dictionaries
 Alfred Götze. Frühneuhochdeutsches Glossar. 2. Aufl. Bonn 1920 (= Kleine Texte für Vorlesungen und Übungen, 101); 5. Aufl. Berlin 1956; Neudrucke 1960 u. ö. The second edition (1920) is online: archive.org.
 Christa Baufeld, Kleines frühneuhochdeutsches Wörterbuch. Niemeyer, Tübingen 1996, .
 Frühneuhochdeutsches Wörterbuch. Hrsg. von Robert R. Anderson [für Bd. 1] / Ulrich Goebel / Anja Lobenstein-Reichmann [für die Bände 5, 6, 11–13] und Oskar Reichmann. Berlin / New York 1989 ff.

External links
 Early New High German texts (German Wikisource)
 Luther's translation of the New Testament (German Wikisource)

History of the German language
High German languages
German, High